Ksawerów may refer to the following places in Poland:
Ksawerów, Warsaw, a neighborhood in the Mokotów district of Warsaw
Ksawerów, Kalisz County in Greater Poland Voivodeship (west-central Poland)
Ksawerów, Konin County in Greater Poland Voivodeship (west-central Poland)
Ksawerów, Września County in Greater Poland Voivodeship (west-central Poland)
Ksawerów, Łęczyca County in Łódź Voivodeship (central Poland)
Ksawerów, Łódź East County in Łódź Voivodeship (central Poland)
Ksawerów, Pajęczno County in Łódź Voivodeship (central Poland)
Ksawerów, Pabianice County in Łódź Voivodeship (central Poland)
Ksawerów, Lower Silesian Voivodeship (south-west Poland)
Ksawerów, Lublin Voivodeship (east Poland)
Ksawerów, Świętokrzyskie Voivodeship (south-central Poland)